The 2018 Czech Athletics Championships was the 26th edition of the national outdoor track and field championships for the Czech Republic. It was held on 28 and 29 July at the Municipal Stadium Sletiště in Kladno. The host club for the competition was AC Tepo Kladno. The same venue is used for the annual TNT – Fortuna Meeting combined events meeting.

Several events were held separately from the main track and field competition. The 10,000 metres took place in Brno on 28 April, the marathon championships were held within the annual Prague Marathon on 6 May, and the 20 kilometres race walk championships were held within the annual Poděbrady Race Walking meet in Poděbrady on 7 April. The men's 50 kilometres race walk was cancelled.

Results

Men

Women

References

Results
 Kompletní přehled výsledků MČR 2018. atletika.cz. Retrieved 2019-07-24.

External links
 Czech Athletics Federation website

Czech Athletics Championships
Czech Athletics Championships
Czech Athletics Championships
Czech Athletics Championships
Sport in Kladno